The Home and Colonial School Society was a school founded in 1836 by Elizabeth Mayo, Charles Mayo, James Pierrepont Greaves and John S. Reynolds for the education of children and the training of teachers especially by then novel methods proposed by Pestalozzi. It was located on Gray's Inn Road in London.

Notable people
Hana Catherine Mullens, who worked in zenana missions in British India
Charlotte Mason, British educational philosopher and founder of the Parents National Education Union
 Marianne Bernard, mistress at Girton College#
 Jane Roadknight, school inspector in Nottingham

References

External links
 history
 School details

Defunct schools in the City of London